Publius Rutilius Rufus Pray (died December 11, 1839) was a justice of the Supreme Court of Mississippi from 1838 to 1839.

Born in Maine, he was named for Roman statesman Publius Rutilius Rufus. [He entered the practice of law in Hancock County, Mississippi. He served as president of the Mississippi constitutional convention of 1832. Pray "resided at Pearlington, near the sea coast, where lands were held mainly under old French and Spanish grants. He attended the courts in New Orleans and thus acquired a taste for the civil law". In 1833, he was empowered by the legislature to revise the statutes of the State. In doing the work he was "ambitious of originality" and caused the code "to smack too strongly of the Roman law". This displeased legislators who preferred the common law, and the proposed code was rejected.

Pray was elected to a seat on the state supreme court in 1837 and held the position until his death in 1839. He died at his residence, near Pearlington, Mississippi, after a lengthy period of poor health.

References

Date of birth unknown
1839 deaths
Justices of the Mississippi Supreme Court